Kristina Vengrytė (born 21 December 1981 in Vilnius) is a Lithuanian women's basketball player who plays for the Kibirkstis Vilnius of the Lithuanian Women's Basketball League and is member of the Lithuanian national team.

Vengrytė has represented Lithuania at several Eurobasket Women (2007, 2013).

References

External links
Profile at FIBA Europe page
 Bckibirkstis

1981 births
Living people
Lithuanian women's basketball players
Small forwards